Wutongqiao District is an urban district of the prefecture-level city of Leshan, Sichuan province, China. As a separate city on the banks of the Min River, Wutongqiao was formerly romanized as Wutungkiao.

It has been known for producing salt since at least the 19th century.

Transport
China National Highway 213

Notes

References

Districts of Sichuan
Leshan